Happy Hogan may refer to:

Happy Hogan (character), character in the Iron Man comics series
Happy Hogan (Marvel Cinematic Universe), the same character, in movies
Happy Hogan (baseball) (1877–1915), American baseball player